The 2nd constituency of the Aisne is a French legislative constituency in the Aisne département.

Description

Aisne's 2nd constituency surrounds the city of Saint-Quentin in the north west of the department.

Historically the seat has swung between left and right. It has seen long periods of both Gaullist and Communist control.

At the 2012 elections former Minister of Social Affairs and Employment and UMP Chairman Xavier Bertrand held on to seat by only 222 votes.  

More recently, the seat has been more firmly right, with the second round in both 2017 and 2022 being between the Republicans and National Front/National Rally.

Historic representation

Election results

2022

 

 
|-
| colspan="8" bgcolor="#E9E9E9"|
|-

2017

2012

|- style="background-color:#E9E9E9;text-align:center;"
! colspan="2" rowspan="2" style="text-align:left;" | Candidate
! rowspan="2" colspan="2" style="text-align:left;" | Party
! colspan="2" | 1st round
! colspan="2" | 2nd round
|- style="background-color:#E9E9E9;text-align:center;"
! width="75" | Votes
! width="30" | %
! width="75" | Votes
! width="30" | %
|-
| style="background-color:" |
| style="text-align:left;" | Xavier Bertrand
| style="text-align:left;" | Union for a Popular Movement
| UMP
| 
| 38.89%
| 
| 50.25%
|-
| style="background-color:" |
| style="text-align:left;" | Anne Ferreira
| style="text-align:left;" | Socialist Party
| PS
| 
| 35.47%
| 
| 49.75%
|-
| style="background-color:" |
| style="text-align:left;" | Yannick Lejeune
| style="text-align:left;" | National Front
| FN
| 
| 16.29%
| colspan="2" style="text-align:left;" |
|-
| style="background-color:" |
| style="text-align:left;" | Guy Fontaine
| style="text-align:left;" | Left Front
| FG
| 
| 4.74%
| colspan="2" style="text-align:left;" |
|-
| style="background-color:" |
| style="text-align:left;" | Paul Gironde
| style="text-align:left;" | Centre
| CEN
| 
| 1.39%
| colspan="2" style="text-align:left;" |
|-
| style="background-color:" |
| style="text-align:left;" | Michel Aurigny
| style="text-align:left;" | Far Left
| EXG
| 
| 0.66%
| colspan="2" style="text-align:left;" |
|-
| style="background-color:" |
| style="text-align:left;" | Jean-Thierry Gampert
| style="text-align:left;" | Far Right
| EXD
| 
| 0.62%
| colspan="2" style="text-align:left;" |
|-
| style="background-color:" |
| style="text-align:left;" | Anne Zanditenas
| style="text-align:left;" | Far Left
| EXG
| 
| 0.54%
| colspan="2" style="text-align:left;" |
|-
| style="background-color:" |
| style="text-align:left;" | Sylvie Glinatsis
| style="text-align:left;" | Ecologist
| ECO
| 
| 0.50%
| colspan="2" style="text-align:left;" |
|-
| style="background-color:" |
| style="text-align:left;" | Guillaume Buil
| style="text-align:left;" | Ecologist
| ECO
| 
| 0.50%
| colspan="2" style="text-align:left;" |
|-
| style="background-color:" |
| style="text-align:left;" | Antonio Ribeiro
| style="text-align:left;" | Miscellaneous Left
| DVG
| 
| 0.40%
| colspan="2" style="text-align:left;" |
|-
| colspan="8" style="background-color:#E9E9E9;"|
|- style="font-weight:bold"
| colspan="4" style="text-align:left;" | Total
| 
| 100%
| 
| 100%
|-
| colspan="8" style="background-color:#E9E9E9;"|
|-
| colspan="4" style="text-align:left;" | Registered voters
| 
| style="background-color:#E9E9E9;"|
| 
| style="background-color:#E9E9E9;"|
|-
| colspan="4" style="text-align:left;" | Blank/Void ballots
| 
| 1.29%
| 
| 2.86%
|-
| colspan="4" style="text-align:left;" | Turnout
| 
| 61.89%
| 
| 62.77%
|-
| colspan="4" style="text-align:left;" | Abstentions
| 
| 38.11%
| 
| 37.23%
|-
| colspan="8" style="background-color:#E9E9E9;"|
|- style="font-weight:bold"
| colspan="6" style="text-align:left;" | Result
| colspan="2" style="background-color:" | UMP HOLD
|}

2007

References

Sources
 Official results of French elections from 1998: 

2